Leslie Larkin Byrne (born October 27, 1946) is an American businesswoman and politician. In 1992, she became the first woman elected to the United States House of Representatives from the Commonwealth of Virginia. A member of the Democratic Party, she served for one term (1993–1995) in the 103rd Congress.

Early life and career
Byrne grew up in Salt Lake City and attended both the University of Utah and Mount Vernon College in Ohio. After her family moved to Northern Virginia in 1971, she became active with several community organizations, including the Parent Teacher Association for her children's schools, the Fairfax Area League of Women Voters and the Fairfax County Commission on Fair Campaign Practices.

In 1985, Byrne co-founded Quintech Associates, Inc., a human resources consulting firm. She served as president of Quintech until her election to Congress in 1992.

Virginia House
Byrne served in the Virginia House of Delegates for six years, having defeated two-term Republican incumbent Gwen Cody in 1985. In this role, she supported public/private partnerships for transportation, including the Dulles Greenway project.

Tenure in Congress
In 1992, Virginia was awarded an additional House seat as a result of the 1990 U.S. Census. Byrne ran for Congress that year in the newly created . When she won that race, she became the first woman elected to Congress from Virginia. The election year 1992 was known as the "Year of the Woman" for the large number of women elected to Congress in that election.

 While a member of the 103rd Congress, Byrne served on the Public Works and Transportation Committee. She was also a member of the Post Office and Civil Service Committee.

The freshman Democratic members of the 103rd Congress elected her to the leadership position of freshman caucus whip. She introduced and passed more legislation than any other freshman representative, including two of her measures on childhood immunization that were passed into law. She helped obtain funds for rail from Tysons Corner to Dulles Airport.

Thomas M. Davis, then chairman of the Fairfax County Board of Supervisors, defeated her for re-election in 1994's "Republican Revolution." His campaign charged that Byrne was too liberal for the swing district she represented and that her voting record was too supportive of President Bill Clinton.

Political career after Congress
In 1996, Byrne sought the Democratic nomination for the U.S. Senate to challenge incumbent Senator John Warner. Future Virginia Governor Mark Warner (no relation) won the nomination at the 1996 Virginia Democratic Convention, garnering 1,889 delegates to Byrne's 231.  He lost to Senator Warner in the general election.

In 1998, Byrne began work at the United States Information Agency, advising its director on the au pair program.

Byrne returned to elected office in 1999 when she was elected to the Senate of Virginia, winning a very close election against two-term incumbent Republican Jane Woods (45.52% to Wood's 45.39%). She left the Senate after one term, choosing not to seek reelection after she was drawn into the same district as another Democratic incumbent during redistricting. In the Virginia Senate, she sponsored legislation to prohibit people from sleeping in rooms except bedrooms, a response to complaints of students and poor immigrants crowded into residential houses.

Byrne was the 2005 Democratic Party candidate for Lieutenant Governor of Virginia. Republican Party candidate Bill Bolling defeated her in the November 8, 2005 general election by 1.2%.

2008 congressional race

In 2008, Byrne ran for the Democratic nomination for Virginia's 11th congressional district, the seat she held from 1992 to 1994. The incumbent Republican, Thomas M. Davis, had announced he would not seek reelection. In the primary election on June 10, 2008, she faced Gerald Connolly, chairman of the Fairfax County Board of Supervisors, and others in a multi- candidate field. Connolly defeated Byrne 58% to 33% and went on to defeat Republican Keith Fimian in the general election.

Personal life
She is married to Larry Byrne, who is president of an international consulting firm. They have two grown children and three grandchildren.

Election results

See also
Women in the United States House of Representatives

References

External links
 
 
     Virginia House of Delegates biography
 Campaign site

1946 births
Living people
Democratic Party Virginia state senators
Democratic Party members of the Virginia House of Delegates
Female members of the United States House of Representatives
University of Utah alumni
Women state legislators in Virginia
20th-century American politicians
Democratic Party members of the United States House of Representatives from Virginia
20th-century American women politicians
21st-century American politicians
21st-century American women politicians
Candidates in the 2008 United States elections